Vincenzo Zaccheo (born 10 May 1947) was an Italian politician who served as Deputy (1994–2006) and Mayor of Latina (2002–2010).

References

1947 births
Living people
Mayors of Latina, Lazio
Deputies of Legislature XII of Italy
Deputies of Legislature XIII of Italy
Deputies of Legislature XIV of Italy
Italian Social Movement politicians
National Alliance (Italy) politicians
The People of Freedom politicians